Monte Bertrand (Italian) or Mont Bertrand  (French) is a mountain located on the French-Italian border between Piemonte and Provence-Alpes-Côte d'Azur.

History 

The mountain up to World War II was totally belonging to Italy but, following the Paris Peace Treaties, signed in February 1947, is now shared between Italy and France.

Geography 
 
The mountain belongs to the Ligurian Alps and is located on the main chain of the Alps. On its top three ridges meet; one of them heads West dividing two tributary valleys of the Roya, Vallon du Réfrei (north) and Vallon du Morignole. Going North the main chain of the Alps connects the mountain with the Colle delle Selle Vecchie, while southwards the saddle of Colla Rossa (2172 m) divides the Monte Bertrand from the neighbouring Cime de Missun. On the Italian side of the mountain runs a former-military dirt road connecting Monesi (a village of the municipality of Triora) with the colle di Tenda. The summit of the Monte Bertrand is marked by a cairn and a summit cross and can be easily seen from Upega, a village of the iItalian comune of Briga Alta, and by Morignolo, located in the French mairie of La Brigue.

SOIUSA classification 
According to the SOIUSA (International Standardized Mountain Subdivision of the Alps) the mountain can be classified in the following way:
 main part = Western Alps
 major sector = South Western Alps
 section = Ligurian Alps
 subsection = (It:Alpi del Marguareis/Fr:Alpes Liguriennes Occidentales)
 supergroup = (It:Catena del Saccarello /Fr:Chaîne du Mont Saccarel) 
 group = (It:Gruppo del Monte Saccarello /Fr:Groupe du Mont Saccarel) 
 subgroup = (It:Nodo del Monte Saccarello /Fr:Nœud du Mont Saccarel) 
 code = I/A-1.II-A.1.a

Environment 
The mountain is made of steep but regular and mainly grassy slopes on its western side, and is rockier on the eastern one. Its NE slopes are included in the Parco naturale del Marguareis.

Hiking 
The mountain is accessible by an unmarked footpaths both from the saddle of Colla Rossa (South) and from the Colle delle Selle Vecchie (in the second case crossing the Cima Valega).

Maps

References

See also

 France–Italy border

Mountains of the Ligurian Alps
Mountains of Alpes-Maritimes
Mountains of Piedmont
Two-thousanders of France
France–Italy border
International mountains of Europe
Two-thousanders of Italy
Mountains partially in France